Fred Harvey may refer to:

 Fred Harvey (entrepreneur) (1835–1901), entrepreneur, founder of the Fred Harvey Company
 Frederick Maurice Watson Harvey (1888–1980), rugby player and military officer
 F. W. Harvey (1888–1957), poet
 Buster Harvey (Frederick John Charles Harvey, 1950–2007), Canadian ice hockey player
 Frederick E. B. Harvey, 19th-century British diplomat
 Fred Harvey (politician) (born 1942), Canadian politician
 Fred Harvey Company, a chain of restaurants and hotels alongside railroads in the western United States

See also
 Alfred Harvey (1913–1994), founder of comic book publisher Harvey Comics